Costentalina elegans is a species of medium-sized tusk shell, a marine scaphopod mollusc in the family Entalinidae. It is found in Australia and the Indian Ocean. It is an abyssal species and lives at a depth of 5100 to 5800 m.

References

External links
 Costentalina elegans at the World Register of Marine Species (WoRMS)

Scaphopods
Molluscs described in 1982